Priya Kumar (b. 4 March 1974) is an Indian motivational speaker and writer. She is an author of 12 books including novels and self-help books. Her works mainly deal with inspirational and spiritual themes. Her book License to Live (2010) was nominated for Vodafone Crossword Book Award in 2010. In 2019, her novel I Will Go with You (2015) was adapted into web television series The Final Call, starring Arjun Rampal, Sakshi Tanwar, Javed Jaffrey.

Early life 
Priya Kumar was born on 4 March 1974 in Chandigarh, India. She took her schooling at St. Kabir Public School, Chandigarh. She graduated from the University of Bombay in economics, and obtained master's degree in psychotherapy and counter selling. She later done her post-graduation in marketing and sales from NMIMS university. She started her career as a motivational speaker at the age of 22.

Works 
Priya is an author of 12 books. Her works mainly deals with inspirational and spiritual themes.

In 2010, she published her first book License to Live, a self-help book with spiritual theme, which she termed as 'inspiration thriller' and 'spiritual fiction'. It won the Eric Hoffer Award in 2012. It is a collection of fictionalized fables with first person narration. Her next book I Am Another You: A Journey To Powerful Breakthroughs was published in the same year and became bestseller. It deals with the themes such as self-realization and shamanism. It narrates Priya's experiences with shamans tribe, an ancient traibal group in Netherlands. I Am Another You was shortlisted for the Eric Hoffer Grand Prize Award. Next year she published her novel The Perfect World.

In 2014, she wrote biography of Om Prakash Munjal, an Indian businessman and founder of Hero Cycles, under the title The Inspiring Journey of a Hero. Written in the style of self-help book, it narrates Munjal's life journey with motivational approach. The book covers Munjal's major aspects of life including his early life, partition, and handling his bicycle company. It was published by Penguin Books in 2014. Writers Alice McDermott in Sunday Tribune and P. P. Ramachandran in The Free Press Journal reviewed the biography and praised for its inspiration portrayals of Munjal. It was translated into Hindi under the title Ek Super Hero Ki Shandaar Kahani (2015).

In 2015, she published suspense thriller novel I Will Go with You. Its plot follows a pilot of flight, who decides to commit suicide while on board. Instead of dying alone, he chooses to endanger the lives of 300 passengers of the flight and dies in mid-air along with them. It deals with several themes including afterlife, karma, mortality and spirituality. I Will Go With You became bestseller, and was adapted into 2019 web television series The Final Call, starring Arjun Rampal, Sakshi Tanwar, Javed Jaffrey. In April 2019, Priya announced that she is writing the second season of The Final Call. In January 2019, ZEE5 announced another web-series adaptation of her book The Wise Man Said (2017).

She is also featured in the list of top 10 Indian Motivational Speakers.

Publications 
 License to Live (2010)
 I Am Another You: A Journey To Powerful Breakthroughs (2010)
 The Perfect World: A Journey To Infinite Possibilities (2011)
 Thinking Aloud: A Collection Of Original Inspirational Quotes (2013)
 The Inspiring Journey of a Hero (2014)
 I Will Go with You: The Flight of a Lifetime (2015)
 Dream Dare Deliver (2015)
 Ek Super Hero Ki Shandaar Kahani (2015), Hindi translation of The Inspiring Journey of a Hero
 The Calling – Unleash Your True Self (2016)
 How to Write a Book in 8 Days (2017)
 The Wise Man Said (2017)
 Man Hunt (2020)
 Shuttler's Flick: Making Every Match Count (2021)
 A Regal Man: The Life & Lessons of Vasu Shroff (2021)

See also
 List of Indian writers

References

External links
 Official website
 

1974 births
Living people
21st-century Indian women writers
21st-century Indian writers
Indian women screenwriters
Indian thriller writers
Indian women novelists